Lofn may refer to
Lofn, a deity of Norse mythology;
Lofn (crater), a crater on the Jovian moon Callisto.